Domingo Zaldúa Anabitarte (10 July 1903 – 17 June 1986) was a Spanish international footballer who played as a defender.

Born in San Sebastián, he spent his entire career from 1923 to 1930 with his hometown club, Real Sociedad. He played in all three editions of the 1928 Copa del Rey Final against FC Barcelona, and scored in the second replay on 29 June, although Sociedad lost 3–1.

He made his international debut on 22 May 1927 in a friendly away to France, scoring two penalties in a 5–1 victory. He was selected for the 1928 Olympics in Amsterdam, and opened the scoring in their quarter-final 1–1 draw with Italy. The 7–1 defeat in the replay was his last appearance for Spain.

International goals
Scores and results list Spain's goal tally first.

Honours
Real Sociedad
Copa del Rey: Runner-up 1928

References
General

Specific

External links
 

1903 births
1986 deaths
People from San Sebastián
Footballers from the Basque Country (autonomous community)
Real Sociedad footballers
La Liga players
Spanish footballers
Association football defenders
Spain international footballers
Olympic footballers of Spain
Footballers at the 1928 Summer Olympics